Rosemont High School is a public high school located in Sacramento, California, USA. Designed by DLR Group, its completed buildings opened in 2003. Rosemont H.S. is part of the Sacramento City Unified School District.

Athletics 
Rosemont fields teams in the following sports: baseball, 
men's basketball, women's basketball, cross country running, American football, boys' and girls' golf, boys' and girls' soccer, softball, swimming, boys' and girls' tennis, track and field, volleyball, water polo, and wrestling.

Notable alumni

Sam Long (born 1995), San Francisco Giants baseball player

References 

Educational institutions established in 2003
High schools in Sacramento, California
Public high schools in California
2003 establishments in California